Neptis penningtoni, or Pennington's sailer, is a butterfly in the family Nymphalidae. It is found in south-eastern Kenya, western Tanzania, Zambia, Mozambique, Zimbabwe and South Africa (Limpopo). The habitat consists of Brachystegia woodland, especially on wooded hills.

Adults are on wing in April and from July to December.

The larvae feed on Julbernardia globiflora. They prefer freshly emerged shoots of their host plant

References

Butterflies described in 1977
penningtoni